Underbool is a town in the Mallee region of north-west Victoria, Australia. The town services the grain farmers and graziers in the area. For tourists it provides access to the Pink Lakes in Murray-Sunset National Park.

The town name is thought to come from the German word underbolt given to it by surveyor Dr. Neumayer when he camped there in October 1861.

A post office opened on 15 July 1912 when a regular mail service was provided by the opening of the railway from Ouyen to Murrayville a month earlier.

Underbool Primary School (No. 3819) opened on 5 November 1913, with a purpose-built school building opening in June 1919. A second weatherboard building was built in 1929, and the former Daalko school building moved there in 1967.

With its neighbouring township Walpeup Underbool had a football team (Walpeup-Underbool) in the Mallee Football League until the league folded in 2015. The team merged with Ouyen and play two matches a season in Underbool in the Sunraysia Football League. Golfers play at the course of the Underbool Golf Club on Monash Avenue.

Notable People from Underbool include Greg Brown, independent MP, Raymond 'Bear' Erhardt, John Deer Enthusiast, James Kilpatrick, professional Latin dancer, and Dallas Willsmore, AFL footballer player.;

References

External links

Towns in Victoria (Australia)
Mallee (Victoria)